Vietnam is a mural-size painting made by Nabil Kanso in 1974 in response to the Vietnam War. It is done in oil on canvas measuring 3.65 by 7.30 meters (12 X 24 feet).

See also
The Split of Life

References

External links
Vietnam painting

Modern paintings
War paintings
Anti-war paintings
1974 paintings
Vietnam War in popular culture
Paintings by Nabil Kanso